The American Trap is a 2008 Canadian drama film from Quebec, directed by Charles Binamé. The film stars Rémy Girard as Lucien Rivard, a Canadian working in the criminal underworld of Havana, Cuba who becomes enmeshed in international intrigue around the assassination of John F. Kennedy.

Cast
 Rémy Girard : Lucien Rivard
 Gérard Darmon : Paul Mondolini
 Colm Feore : Maurice Bishop
 Serge Houde : DEA Agent Thompson
 Bill Lake : Herbert Hoover
 Manuel Tadros : Joseph Valachi

Award nominations
The film garnered five Genie Award nominations at the 29th Genie Awards in 2009:
Best Cinematography: Pierre Gill
Best Art Direction/Production Design: Danielle Labrie 
Best Costume Design: Michèle Hamel
Best Overall Sound: Claude La Haye, Daniel Bisson, Luc Boudrias and Patrick Lalonde
Best Sound Editing: Jean-François Sauvé, Natalie Fleurant, Jérôme Décarie and Claude Beaugrand

References

External links

2008 films
2008 crime drama films
Canadian crime drama films
2000s French-language films
Films set in Quebec
Films directed by Charles Binamé
2000s English-language films
Canadian multilingual films
French-language Canadian films
2000s Canadian films